Caradog Falls Halt railway station was one of five new halts on the Carmarthen to Aberystwyth Line (originally called the Manchester and Milford Railway before being transferred to the GWR), which were constructed during the 1930s.

The halt opened in September 1932 to serve the nearby hamlet of Tynygraig, where a short tunnel ran underneath the road.  It was also intended for the convenience of any visitors to the waterfalls. The halt consisted of a timber platform and corrugated iron shelter.

The station closed in December 1964 when services were truncated at Strata Florida, following flood damage to the line at Llanilar. Formal closure was confirmed two months later.

No trace of the timber halt remains, and the site is now in use as a private garden.

References

Sources

Further reading
 Holden, J.S. (1979, revised 2nd edition 2007): The Manchester & Milford Railway, Oakwood Press,  

Disused railway stations in Ceredigion
Former Great Western Railway stations
Beeching closures in Wales
Railway stations in Great Britain opened in 1932
Railway stations in Great Britain closed in 1964